The Cross River State House of Assembly is the legislative chamber of Cross River State in Nigeria.

History 
In 2021, the legislative complex was renovated.

In May 2022, the assembly was occupied by protestors.

Functions 
The assembly has three main functions.

 Law Making
 Representative Function
 Deliberative Function

References 

State legislatures of Nigeria
Politics of Cross River State